Nobody's Perfect is a live album released in 1988 by the British rock band Deep Purple. It was recorded during the band's tour in support of The House of Blue Light in 1987 in Europe and the United States. The outer sleeve photography was by Aubrey Powell of Hipgnosis with graphics by Richard Evans.

Track transitions are marked by fades. It also contains a new live in studio version of "Hush" to commemorate their 20th anniversary. "Black Night" was also re-recorded but never released. "Hard Lovin' Woman" includes parts of "Under the Gun" during Blackmore's guitar solo. "Strange Kind of Woman" includes the "Superstar" chorus from Jesus Christ Superstar. "Woman from Tokyo" changes into "Everyday" by Buddy Holly halfway through. The album represented Deep Purple's setlist at the time, which consisted much of the typical Made in Japan set, combined with newer material from the 1984 reunion album Perfect Strangers and The House of Blue Light. Songs such as "The Unwritten Law" and "Difficult to Cure" (which included an extended-riff from Beethoven's Ninth Symphony, 4th Movement) were played every night on the tour, but were not included on this album. On some nights they also played "Call of the Wild" or "Mad Dog".

Track listing
Some of the tracks are not necessarily included in every existing edition of the album. The original 1988 2LP release has 13 tracks, omitting "Dead or Alive". The 1988 cassette version includes "Dead or Alive", but omits "Bad Attitude". First 1-disc CD edition from 1988 consists of just 11 tracks, leaving out both of these and also "Space Truckin'". Finally, all the indicated tracks were included on the 1999 2CD remaster.

Personnel
Deep Purple
 Ritchie Blackmore – guitar
 Ian Gillan – vocals, congas, harmonica
 Jon Lord – organ, keyboards
 Roger Glover – bass
 Ian Paice – drums

Production
 Produced by Roger Glover and Deep Purple
 Mixed at Outside Studios, Hook End Manor, England 11 February – 16 March 1988
 Engineered by Nick Davis
 Assistant engineer: Simon Metcalfe

Charts
 

Album

Singles

References 

1988 live albums
Deep Purple live albums
Mercury Records live albums
Polydor Records live albums
Albums with cover art by Hipgnosis